Saheki is a crater on Mars, located in the Iapygia quadrangle at 21.75° S and 286.97° W. It measures approximately 82 kilometers in diameter and was named after Tsuneo Saheki, a Japanese amateur astronomer (1916–1996). The naming was adopted by IAU's Working Group for Planetary System Nomenclature in 2006.

The crater contains a number of alluvial fans, which are preserved in inverted relief.

See also 
 4606 Saheki, minor planet
 Climate of Mars
 Geology of Mars
 List of craters on Mars
 Ore resources on Mars
 Planetary nomenclature

References 

Impact craters on Mars
Iapygia quadrangle